Endling: Extinction is Forever is an indie survival-adventure game developed by Spanish studio Herobeat Studios and published by German HandyGames. It has been released for Microsoft Windows, Nintendo Switch, PlayStation 4, and Xbox One on July 19, 2022, for Amazon Luna on October 6, 2022, for PlayStation 5 and Xbox Series X/S on November 3, 2022, and for Android and iOS on February 7, 2023.

Gameplay 
Endling is a third-person survival game in a 3D side-scrolling world. The player takes the role of the last mother fox in the world, who is accompanied throughout the game by her cubs who must be protected and fed. The pups can learn different skills that help increase their chances of survival.

Plot 
In a post-apocalyptic world, the story begins with the mother fox trying to escape from a human-caused forest fire. She once manages to escape from it, and being injured after suffering a fall, she seeks a shelter where she will give birth to her cubs. During the first days everything seems to be going well, until one fateful night, a scavenger captures one of her puppies. The desperate mother fox goes out in an effort to track down the scavenger to find her lost cub, while she has to ensure that her other cubs survive in a polluted and desolate world. On her journey she meets a wide variety of characters. Among others: hunters, a furrier, a mother badger with whom she may become friends, and eventually Molly, a girl who helps them by giving them food. After several nights following the scavenger's tracks, she finally finds him, and with him also her puppy and Molly, who turns out to be his daughter who is very sick and needs her father to buy medicine, which he can't afford. The next day, Molly dies and her scavenger father, inconsolable, decides to commit suicide, unable to bear the pain of his daughter's death, although the mother fox tries consoling him. Shortly after, a large flood occurs. The cubs manage to climb into a floating bathtub and the mother fox tries to catch up with them, but she is hit by a barrel and swept away by the current. She wakes up in a deserted and desolate place and hears her cubs, so even though she is injured, she goes to rescue them from a mud puddle. Once she gets them all out, they set off on a long journey into the unknown. They find the mother badger mourning the loss of her cub and soon after she meets the furrier, this time armed with a rifle. She finally reaches an area with vegetation, which appears to be a protected area, and begins to dig her way through the fence that separates this forested area from the rest of the world. The cubs are the first to enter, followed by the mother. But she is hit by a shot from the furrier while she is crossing. Badly injured, her puppies help her move forward hoping to get her to safety, but she can't take it anymore and she collapses and dies. In the final scene, the cubs snuggle up next to her corpse and, afterward, continue on their way with the mother badger, who takes care of them.

Of course, there are a variety of endings depending on how many of her cubs survive, and on whether or not the mother fox helps the badger.

Reception

Accolades 
The game was nominated for the "Games for Impact" award at The Game Awards 2022, which went to As Dusk Falls. The game was also nominated for the "Outstanding Art Direction, Contemporary", "Outstanding Game, Special Class", "Outstanding Original Dramatic Score, New IP", and "Outstanding Game of the Year" awards at the 22nd Annual NAVGTR Awards, winning only one for "Outstanding Game, Special Class". It was also nominated for the "Social Impact Award" at the 23rd Game Developers Choice Awards, and for "Game Beyond Entertainment" at the 19th British Academy Games Awards.

References

External links

2022 video games
Adventure games
Environmental education video games
Fiction about motherhood
HandyGames games
Indie video games
Nintendo Switch games
PlayStation 4 games
Post-apocalyptic video games
Single-player video games
Survival video games
Video games about foxes
Video games developed in Spain
Video games with alternate endings
Windows games
Xbox One games